Anke Ehlers  (born 11 January 1957) is a German psychologist and expert in post-traumatic stress disorder (PTSD). She is a Fellow of the major science academies of the UK and Germany.

She currently works at the University of Oxford as Wellcome Trust Principal Research Fellow and Professor of Experimental Psychopathology. 

With husband David M. Clark, she developed a cognitive model for PTSD. Therapy she and others based on that model is strongly recommended for treating PTSD by the American Psychological Association.  Anke's research has shown that it is a common problem among emergency medical workers, and that a commonly used therapy for PTSD, psychological debriefing, has little provable therapeutic value.

Professional career
Ehlers studied psychology at the University of Kiel and the University of Tübingen, earning a diploma from Tübingen in 1983. She finished her Ph.D. from the same institution in 1985, and earned a habilitation from the University of Marburg in 1990.

While finishing her Ph.D., Ehlers worked at Stanford University from 1984 to 1985 as assistant director of the Laboratory for Clinical Psychopharmacology and Psychophysiology. 

After an assistant professorship at the University of Marburg, she became a full professor at the University of Göttingen in 1991. 

She moved to Oxford as Wellcome Trust Principal Research Fellow in 1993. While here, she lead authored the paper A cognitive model of posttraumatic stress disorder in 1999.

She moved to King's College London in 2000. While here she led a group of people that developed a therapy based her and Clark's model. She returned to Oxford as Wellcome Trust Principal Research Fellow and Professor of Experimental Psychopathology in 2012; she retains a visiting position at King's College London.

Awards and honours
In 2004 she was elected a Fellow of the German Academy of Sciences Leopoldina. She was elected a Fellow of the British Academy in 2010 and is also a member of the Academia Europaea. In 2018 she was appointed Senior Investigator at the UK's National Institute for Health and Care Research (NIHR).

Personal life
She was born in Kiel, West Germany. She is married to her colleague David M. Clark.

References

1957 births
German psychologists
English psychologists
German women psychologists
British women psychologists
University of Tübingen alumni
Academic staff of the University of Marburg
Wellcome Trust Principal Research Fellows
Academic staff of the University of Göttingen
Academics of King's College London
Fellows of Wolfson College, Oxford
Fellows of the British Academy
Members of Academia Europaea
NIHR Senior Investigators
Living people
Fellows of the Academy of Medical Sciences (United Kingdom)